Capital of Maharashtra may refer to:
 Mumbai, summer capital of Maharashtra
 Nagpur, winter capital of Maharashtra